Mi-Août en Bretagne is a French cycling road race that was established in 1960. It is held in the region of Brittany, France. It is rated 2.2 on the UCI Europe Tour. The original race ran from 1960 to 1966. It was then re-established in 1978 by Louis Bihannic. Prior to the 2009 season the race was previously categorised as 1.5 on the UCI Europe Tour; by the final edition in 2012, it was categorised as 2.2. Citing financial problems, the race was not held after 2012.

Classification jerseys

Riders aim to win overall but there are five further competitions: points, mountains, the best young rider, best placed non French rider, best placed rider from Brittany and combined points leader. The leader of each wears a distinctive jersey. A rider who leads more than one competition wears the jersey of the most prestigious. The abandoned jersey is worn by the second in the competition.

 General classification
  Sprinters points classification
 Mountains classification
 Best placed non French rider in General classification (has now been abolished)
 Combined points leader
 Young rider classification

Winners

References

Cycle races in France
UCI Europe Tour races
Recurring sporting events established in 1960
1960 establishments in France
Recurring sporting events disestablished in 2012
2012 disestablishments in France
Defunct cycling races in France